Samfundet SHT (English translation: "SHT Society") is a parodical  Swedish fraternal order founded in 1844 in Uppsala. It is dedicated to the Roman god Bacchus, the fine arts and mutual enjoyment, vulgarly known as Tratten (the funnel).

History 

Originally a student fraternity, it gradually transformed during the second half of the 19th century and came to encompass mainly older academics and university educated professionals. Around the beginning of the 20th century, members of SHT held a majority of the seats in the Swedish academy and the board of directors of Uppsala University. This dominant position within Sweden's arts and sciences was to a large extent lost during the 20th century, due to social changes and university reforms which came to dilute the influence previously held by the academical elite of Uppsala and Lund. This did however not slow the growth of the society.

Stormästare (grand masters) 
 1844–1845 – Julius von Sydow
 1850 – Carl Magnus Appelberg (första gången)
 1850–1851 – Sem Hedrén
 1851 – Emil Almén
 1851–1859 – Carl Magnus Appelberg (andra gången)
 1859–1860 – Johannes Swedborg
 1860–1861 – Gustaf Bodman
 1861–1866 – Bengt Liljeblad
 1866–1868 – Christian Högman
 1868–1870 – Carl David af Wirsén (första gången)
 1870–1873 – Johan Björkén
 1873–1875 – Carl David af Wirsén (andra gången)
 1875–1878 – Alfred Fahlcrantz
 1878–1897 – Carl Rupert Nyblom
 1897–1902 – Ivar Hedenblad (första gången)
 1902–1905 – Axel Nicolaus Lundström
 1906–1909 – Ivar Hedenblad (andra gången)
 1909–1930 – Carl Axel Brolén
 1930–1956 – Anders Grape
 1956–1969 – Anton Fägersten
 1969–1983 – Åke Davidsson
 1983–1992 – Rikard Kupper
 1992–2000 – Claes Wirsén
 2000–2003 – Lars Peterson
 2003–2010 – Styrbjörn Jacobsson
 2010–2015 – Mattias Lundgren
 2015–ff – Peter Ekman

Organisation 

Today, SHT has lodges or other suborganisations in 27 Swedish cities and a small chapter in Copenhagen, Denmark.

References

Fraternities and sororities in Sweden
Student organizations established in 1844
Uppsala University
Bacchanalian fraternities
1844 establishments in Sweden